Nadine Weratschnig (born 18 April 1998) is an Austrian slalom canoeist who has competed at the international level since 2013.

She won two bronze medals at the ICF Canoe Slalom World Championships, earning them in 2015 (C1 team) and 2019 (C1). She also won a bronze medal in the C1 event at the 2017 European Championships in Tacen. She represented Austria at the delayed 2020 Summer Olympics in Tokyo, finishing fifth in the C1 event.

Weratschnig is one of only a few female C1 paddlers who does not switch. She paddles on the right side and uses the crossbow stroke on the left side.

Her twin sister Nina is also a slalom canoeist.

World Cup individual podiums

References

External links

Austrian female canoeists
Living people
1998 births
Canoeists at the 2014 Summer Youth Olympics
Medalists at the ICF Canoe Slalom World Championships
Youth Olympic gold medalists for Austria
Canoeists at the 2020 Summer Olympics
Olympic canoeists of Austria
20th-century Austrian women
21st-century Austrian women